The humpback cat shark (Apristurus gibbosus) is a cat shark of the family Scyliorhinidae in the order Carcharhiniformes, found in the northwest Pacific Ocean off Zhujiang, South China Sea, from the surface to 915 m.  Its length is 39–41 cm. The largest specimen examined by Nakaya and Sato was 54.2 cm TL. The humpback catshark is a little-known oviparous deepwater catshark.

References 

 

humpback catshark
Marine fish of Southeast Asia
South China Sea
Taxa named by Meng Qing-Wen
Taxa named by Chu Yuan-Ting
Taxa named by Li Sheng (ichthyologist)
humpback catshark